Choerophryne allisoni is a tiny species of frog in the family Microhylidae. It is endemic to Papua New Guinea and only known from its type locality, Mount Sisa in the Southern Highlands Province. The specific name allisoni honours , an American herpetologist. Common name Allison's mountain frog has been coined for this species.

Description
The type series consists of two adult males that measure  in snout–vent length. The snout is projecting and moderately elongated. The tympanum is indistinct and poorly defined. The first finger is reduced, the other fingers have tips that are at most slightly expanded. The first toe is partly fused with the second. The toe tips are rounded or expanded into small discs. No digital webbing is present. The dorsum is dark brown with various darker or paler patterns; a pale mid-vertebral stripe is present.

The male advertisement call is a single, short "bleat" consisting of 5–6 notes. The call interval is about 5–7 seconds. The dominant frequency is 4220–4960 Hz.

Habitat and conservation
The specimens were found calling from within leaf litter on the forest floor. Development is presumably direct (i.e., there is no free-living larval stage), as in other species in the genus.

Threats to this species are unknown. It is not known to occur in any protected areas.

References

allisoni
Amphibians of New Guinea
Amphibians of Papua New Guinea
Endemic fauna of New Guinea
Endemic fauna of Papua New Guinea
Amphibians described in 2003
Taxa named by Stephen J. Richards
Taxonomy articles created by Polbot